Smilax californica, the California greenbriar, is a common woody vine native to northern California and southwestern Oregon in the western United States.

The leaves are dull green, petioled, alternate, and circular to heart-shaped. They are generally 5–10 cm long. The stems are round, green and have sharp spines.

The plant is native to coniferous streambanks below 5000 feet.

References

Smilacaceae
Flora of California
Flora of Oregon
Plants described in 1878
Flora without expected TNC conservation status